Alfatar Municipality is a small municipality (obshtina) in Silistra Province, Northeastern Bulgaria, located in the Danubian Plain, in the area of the South Dobrudzha geographical region, about 15 km south of Danube river. It is named after its administrative centre - the town of Alfatar.

The main road "7" crosses the area from north to south, connecting the province centre of Silistra with the city of Shumen and the eastern operating part of Hemus motorway.

Settlements 

Alfatar Municipality includes the following 7 places (towns are shown in bold):

Demography 
The following table shows the change of the population during the last four decades.

Ethnic groups 
Ethnic Bulgarians constitute the majority of the population of Alfatar Municipality, followed by ethnic Turks and Roma people in Bulgaria.

Religion 
According to the latest Bulgarian census of 2011, the religious composition, among those who answered the optional question on religious identification, was the following:

Vital statistics

See also
Provinces of Bulgaria
Municipalities of Bulgaria
List of cities and towns in Bulgaria

References

External links
 Official website 

Municipalities in Silistra Province